Fissurella nigra, common name the black keyhole limpet, is a species of sea snail, a marine gastropod mollusk in the family Fissurellidae, the keyhole limpets and slit limpets.

Description
The size of the shell varies between 45 mm and 110 mm.

Distribution
This marine species occurs in the Pacific from Paru to the Strait of Magellan (but not off the Galapagos Islands)

References

External links
 To Antarctic Invertebrates
 To Biodiversity Heritage Library (21 publications)
 To Encyclopedia of Life
 To World Register of Marine Species
 

Fissurellidae
Gastropods described in 1831
Taxa named by René Lesson